Pelota (Spanish for ball) can refer to the popular and shortened names for a number of ball games:

 Basque pelota
 Chaza
 Jai alai
 Mesoamerican ballgame
 Palla
 Pelota mixteca
 Valencian pilota
 Frontenis
 Pétanque
 Racketlon